Adolescent’s Orquesta is a Venezuelan "romántica" salsa band directed and produced by Porfi Baloa in 1995 in Caracas, Venezuela.

History

Early years and Adolescent’s Orquesta (1995–present) 

In 1995, the Adolescent’s Orquesta released its first album "Reclamando Nuestro Espacio" which contains songs such as "Longing", "Today I learned", "I can't be your friend", among others and which became a musical success a few weeks after its launch, managing to take the promotional theme “Anhelo” to the first place in the Record Report, which for several weeks was the most broadcast theme on the country's radio stations.

Later, at the end of 1996 and with new members, "Persona Ideal" went on sale, the second production where successful songs from the orchestra were found, such as "Repentant", "Social Class", "Jealousy and Distance", "Horas Lindas" , and more, it is worth noting that this production marks a record in the record history of our country since all the songs contained in it reached first place on the national music billboards. In 1998 Adolescent’s Orquesta ventured into the world of acting and hand in hand with the launch of the third production "LA MISMA PLUMA" they made the successful series Jugando a Ganar which was broadcast with great success not only in Venezuela but in several countries of America Peru, Chile, Colombia among others. The Adolescent’s Orquesta has combined for many years the creation and release of records with promotional tours around the world, visiting countries such as Chile, Colombia, Peru, Costa Rica, Mexico, Ecuador, Argentina, Holland, Belgium, Germany, Switzerland, Italy, the United States, Japan, and many others where they have had the opportunity to participate in festivals such as Milan or Turin and even in religious events such as Jubilee 2000, where they had the opportunity to sing and share with Pope John Paul II.

After almost 7 years of foundation, the grouping return to the top places, with the themes of their fourth production "Ahora más que nunca" that brought a variety of rhythms and lyrics, among which the usual salsa, a bachata, se led the Embajadores de la Salsa in Venezuela to the peak of popularity. Currently, Adolescentes Orquesta is preparing its fifth production.

Discography 
Studio albums

 Reclamando Nuestro Espacio (1995)
 Persona Ideal (1997)
 La Misma Pluma (1998)
 Millennium Hits (1999)
 Ahora Más que Núnca (2001)
 Búscame (2005)
 V.I.P. Edition (2006)

Awards and nominations 

 "Mara de Oro" "Meridiano de Oro“ and "Estrella de Oro“ in New York 1996–1997.
 Lo Nuestro, 2010.
 Globo de Oro.

References

External links 
 Adolescent’s Orquesta in YouTube

People from Caracas
Salsa musicians
Venezuelan bandleaders
Place of birth missing (living people)
Sony Music Latin artists
Universal Music Latino artists
Musical groups established in 1995